Carlos Antonio Muñoz Cobo (born 25 August 1961), known simply as Carlos, is a Spanish former professional footballer who played as a striker.

He represented five clubs in his professional career in his country, mainly Oviedo, moving to Mexico well into his 30s where he continued to score at an excellent rate. Over 11 seasons, he amassed La Liga totals of 314 matches and 111 goals.

Early years
Carlos was born in Úbeda, Andalusia. At the age of 7, he moved to Catalonia with his family for working purposes, beginning his career with local amateur clubs and making his senior debut in Tercera División with CF Igualada.

In 1981, Carlos moved to Cádiz for his military service, going on to spend one year out of football as local Cádiz CF tried to acquire him, being denied by Igualada.

Club career
In 1983, Carlos signed for FC Barcelona, going on to appear almost exclusively for its reserves during his spell – he did compete with the first team in the Copa de la Liga – and also being consecutively loaned to Elche CF, Hércules CF and Real Murcia, all in La Liga. In the 1987–88 season, still owned by Barcelona, he joined Real Oviedo in Segunda División, with whom he achieved promotion (finished fourth, but Real Madrid Castilla were ineligible) while winning the Pichichi Trophy.

Carlos subsequently returned to the Camp Nou and, despite his wish to remain with Oviedo, was sold to Atlético Madrid where he could never settle, being barred at the capital side by the likes of Baltazar and Manolo. He returned to the Asturians for the following campaign, proceeding to score 133 competitive goals for them; in seven top-flight seasons, he only netted once in single digits and had 20 in 1993–94.

Subsequently, Carlos had an abroad spell with Mexico's Puebla FC, where he continued to display his scoring ability. In a 12 October 1996 match against Tecos UAG, he scored four times in a 5–2 win. He retired from football altogether after a few games with another club in the country and region, Lobos BUAP, at the age of 40.

International career
Carlos played six times for the Spain national team in six months, scoring as many goals. His first cap came on 12 September 1990 in a friendly with Brazil in Gijón, and he found the net after ten minutes in a 3–0 victory.

After his stellar campaign with Oviedo, Carlos was overlooked by national boss Javier Clemente for his 1994 FIFA World Cup squad even though he was the best national scorer. The pair had had a run-in whilst at Atlético Madrid.

Career statistics
Scores and results list Spain's goal tally first, score column indicates score after each Muñoz goal.

Honours
Individual
Pichichi Trophy (Segunda División): 1987–88
Mexican Primera División Golden Boot: Invierno 1996

References

External links

1961 births
Living people
People from Úbeda
Sportspeople from the Province of Jaén (Spain)
Spanish footballers
Footballers from Andalusia
Association football forwards
La Liga players
Segunda División players
Tercera División players
FC Barcelona Atlètic players
FC Barcelona players
Elche CF players
Hércules CF players
Real Murcia players
Real Oviedo players
Atlético Madrid footballers
Liga MX players
Club Puebla players
Lobos BUAP footballers
Spain international footballers
Spanish expatriate footballers
Expatriate footballers in Mexico
Spanish expatriate sportspeople in Mexico